Rolando Renaut (born August 5, 1987 in Villa Hayes) is a Paraguayan footballer who plays as a midfielder for Real Madrid Español]].

External links
 
 
 
 

1987 births
Living people
People from Villa Hayes
Paraguayan footballers
12 de Octubre Football Club players
Club Olimpia footballers
Sportivo Trinidense footballers
Central Español players
Expatriate footballers in Uruguay
Paraguayan expatriate footballers
Association football midfielders